Jahlane Forbes (born February 5, 2002) is an American soccer player who plays as a defender for Wake Forest Demon Deacons.

Career 
A member of Orlando City's Club Development Academy system since 2016, Forbes made 76 appearances and scored 4 goals across multiple age groups in four seasons with the team.

Forbes made two appearances for Orlando's USL League One affiliate Orlando City B, during their inaugural USL League One season in 2019.

In July 2019, Forbes verbally committed to play for NCAA Division I team Wake Forest beginning Fall 2020.

In January 2020, Forbes spent a month on trial with Brøndby IF in Denmark, playing a series of friendlies with the club's under-19 team.

Forbes returned to Orlando City B for the 2020 season, starting in the season opener on August 1 against Tormenta FC.

International 
Forbes earned his first call up to the United States under-17 national team for international friendlies in Costa Rica on August 2, 2018

Career statistics 
As of August 1, 2020

References

External links 
 
 

2002 births
Living people
American soccer players
Association football defenders
Orlando City B players
People from Clermont, Florida
Soccer players from Florida
Sportspeople from Lake County, Florida
USL League One players
Wake Forest Demon Deacons men's soccer players
United States men's youth international soccer players